Erytheia or Erythia ("the red one"), part of Greek mythology, is one of the three Hesperides. The name was applied to the island close to the coast of southern Hispania, that was the site of the original Punic colony of Gadeira. Pliny's Natural History (4.36) records of the island of Gades: "On the side which looks towards Spain, at about 100 paces distance, is another long island, three miles wide, on which the original city of Gades stood. By Ephorus and Philistides it is called Erythia, by Timæus and Silenus Aphrodisias, and by the natives the Isle of Juno." The island was the seat of Geryon, who was overcome by Heracles. Erytheia was also the place where, according to one account, the sun god Helios kept his sacred cattle when the Giant Alcyoneus stole them during the Gigantomachy.

References

Hesperides
Women of Ares
Women in Greek mythology
Locations in Greek mythology
Helios in mythology